John Garbh Maclean, was the 1st Laird of Coll as an independent unit.

Biography

John was the second son of Lachlan Bronneach Maclean and Fionnaghal, daughter of Sìol Tormoid leader. Fionnaghal was Lachlan's second wife, making John Garbh the third lawful son of Lachlan, and the fourth (and youngest) natural son. Lachlan was the leader of the MacLeans, and his eldest lawful son, Donald MacLean, was his heir.

When John grew into an adult, he gained the sobriquet Garbh, meaning rough, in reference to his gigantic stature and great strength. He was also called John Teomachd, from his cunning and craft.

John's father, Lachlan, was also the grandson of Mary MacDonald, daughter of John of Islay; John's grandfather was thus the cousin of Alexander, the current Lord of the Isles, whose vassals the Macleans were.

Donald MacLean took an armed band to Ardtornish, Alexander's main castle, and demanded a share of the estates Alexander had inherited from John of Islay, on the basis of common descent. After satisfying Alexander's demand that Donald expel the MacMasters (with whom Alexander had fallen out) from Ardgour, Alexander awarded him a charter for Ardgour, and other adjacent lands, which were subsequently confirmed by King James I. Having noticed this, John Garbh decided to try his luck by challenging Alexander in the same way as Donald had; Alexander gave him a charter for:
Coll (comprising 20 poundlands)
Quinish (comprising 18 merklands), in Mull
Loch Eil (comprising 20 poundlands), in Lochaber
Drimnin and Achalennon (together comprising 6 merklands), in Morvern

King James II confirmed Alexander's grant to John. Afterwards, John claimed purchased the island of Rùm (with the associated islands of Canna and Muck) from Allan MacDonald, leader of Clan Ranald; the price was a galley. However, Clan Ranald refused to acknowledge the sale; John Garbh consequently seized Allan MacDonald, and held him prisoner on Coll. After 9 months, Allan was released, presumably having agreed to acknowledge a sale; following this, records describe Rùm (with Canna and Muck) as pertaining to John Garbh's descendants, rather than to Clan Ranald.

John Garbh lived feared by his enemies and respected by his friends. He married Isabella, daughter of Fraser of Lovat, predecessor of Lord Lovat. He was succeeded in his estates by his only son, John Abrach MacLean, 2nd Laird of Coll.

Notes

References

1668 births
1756 deaths
John Garbh
John Garbh